The 1986 Trans America Athletic Conference men's basketball tournament (now known as the ASUN men's basketball tournament) was held March 1–3 at Barton Coliseum in Little Rock, Arkansas.

 defeated  in the championship game, 85–63, to win their first TAAC/Atlantic Sun men's basketball tournament. The Trojans, therefore, received an automatic bid to the 1986 NCAA tournament, their first Division I tournament appearance. 

Stetson joined the TAAC for the 1985–86 season but did not participate in the conference tournament.

Bracket

References

ASUN men's basketball tournament
Tournament
TAAC men's basketball tournament
TAAC men's basketball tournament